This list of architecture awards is an index to articles about notable awards for architecture. It includes global awards, international regional awards, international and national thematic awards, national awards, awards for students and young architects, local awards and humorous awards.

Global

International regional

International and national thematic

National

Students and young architects

Local

Humorous
Carbuncle Awards, presented to buildings and areas in Scotland intermittently since 2000 by the Scottish magazine Urban Realm.
Carbuncle Cup, awarded annually since 2006 by Building Design magazine, for "the ugliest building in the United Kingdom completed in the last 12 months".
 Most Phallic Building contest, a one-off contest held in 2003.

See also
Lists of awards
List of design awards

Websites
 arch2o.com: 5 Highly Prestigious Awards in Architecture That You Should Know

References

 
Awards
Architecture